This is a list of women psychologists.

A

B

C

D

E

F

G

H

I

J

K

L

M

N

O

P

QR

S

T

U

V

W

XZ

Notes

References

 
Women psychologists
Psychologists,Women
Psychologists